Linda Elizabeth Reichl (born 1942) is a statistical physicist who works in the Center for Complex Quantum Systems at the University of Texas at Austin, and is known for her research on quantum chaos.

Education
Reichl completed her Ph.D. in 1969 at the University of Denver with the dissertation Microscopic Theory of Quasiparticle Spin Fluctations in a Fermi Liquid. She was advised by Elizabeth R. Tuttle and Ilya Prigogine.

Books
Reichl's books include:
A Modern Course in Statistical Physics (University of Texas Press, 1980; 4th ed., Wiley, 2016)
The Transition to Chaos: Conservative Systems and Quantum Manifestations (Springer, 1992; 2nd ed., 2004)

She is also the co-editor of several volumes of collected papers.

Recognition
Reichl became a Fellow of the American Physical Society in 2000 "for her original contributions to the field of quantum chaos".

References

External links

1942 births
Living people
American physicists
American women physicists
University of Denver alumni
University of Texas at Austin faculty
Fellows of the American Physical Society
American women academics
21st-century American women